Cryptoblabes is a genus of small moths belonging to the snout moth family (Pyralidae). They are the type genus of the Cryptoblabini tribe of the huge snout moth subfamily Phycitinae. At least one representative of this genus nowadays occurs in many parts of the world, though this is the result of accidental introductions by humans; most species of Cryptoblabes are fairly restricted in range.

Cryptoblabes species can be hard to tell apart from related moths in the field. The lack of forewing vein 7 but no other (though veins 4 and 5 may appear as one proximally) is characteristic at least in some species. The caterpillars are found on a wide range of flowering plants where they eat living overground parts (and sometimes dead leaves); some are highly polyphagous and may occasionally become pests on such diverse crops as Citrus, mango (Mangifera indica), apple guava (Psidium guajava), Tamarindus and common wheat (Triticum aestivum).

Selected species
Species of Cryptoblabes include:

 Cryptoblabes adoceta Turner, 1904
 Cryptoblabes albocostalis (Lucas, 1892)
 Cryptoblabes alphitias Turner, 1913
 Cryptoblabes amphicharis Meyrick, 1933 
 Cryptoblabes angustipennella  Ragonot, 1888
 Cryptoblabes ardescens (Meyrick, 1929) 
 Cryptoblabes bistriga (Haworth, 1811)
 Cryptoblabes ephestialis  Hampson, 1903
 Cryptoblabes euraphella (Meyrick, 1879)
 Cryptoblabes ferrealis Lower, 1902 (tentatively placed here)
 Cryptoblabes gnidiella (Millière, 1867) – honeydew moth, Christmasberry moth
 Cryptoblabes hemigypsa Turner, 1913
 Cryptoblabes mannsheimsi  Roesler, 1969
 Cryptoblabes myosticta (Hampson, 1903)
 Cryptoblabes plagioleuca Turner, 1904
 Cryptoblabes poliella (Lower, 1905)
 Cryptoblabes proleucella Hampson, 1896
 Cryptoblabes trabeata Meyrick, 1932

Footnotes

References

  (1986): Pyralidae and Microlepidoptera of the Marquesas Archipelago. Smithsonian Contributions to Zoology 416: 1-485. PDF fulltext (214 MB!)
  (2004): Butterflies and Moths of the World, Generic Names and their Type-species – Cryptoblabes. Version of 5 November 2004. Retrieved 27 May 2011.
  (2011): Markku Savela's Lepidoptera and Some Other Life Forms – Cryptoblabes. Version of 6 March 2011. Retrieved 27 May 2011.

Cryptoblabini
Pyralidae genera